European route E 577 is a secondary E-road found in northwestern Romania.

Route 
  (on shared signage )
 Ploiești:  
 Buzău:

Former route 
The designation E 577 was previously used on a route from Poltava to Slobozia. That route is now .

External links 
 UN Economic Commission for Europe: Overall Map of E-road Network (2007)

Roads in Romania